The 2011 Saskatchewan Roughriders season was the 54th season for the team in the Canadian Football League. The Roughriders finished 4th place in the West Division with a 5–13 record and were eliminated from the playoffs after a loss to the BC Lions on October 16, 2011. This marks the first time since 2001 that the Roughriders have missed the playoffs.

Offseason

CFL draft
The 2011 CFL Draft took place on Sunday, May 8, 2011. The Roughriders had five selections in the draft, with the first coming in the 12th spot overall, after trading their seventh overall pick to the Toronto Argonauts for the 12th and 27th selections. Saskatchewan selected defensive back Craig Butler with their first pick and were able to select Matt O'Donnell, an offensive lineman who was one of just two CIS players to be named to the American East–West Shrine Game. The Roughriders also selected placekicker Christopher Milo in case their incumbent kicker, Luca Congi, has not recovered in time from a season-ending injury sustained in 2010.

Preseason

Regular season

Season standings

Season schedule

Roster

Coaching staff

References

Saskatchewan Roughriders Season, 2011
Saskatchewan Roughriders seasons
Saskatchewan Roughriders